USS Beaumere II (SP-444) was a United States Navy patrol vessel in commission from 1917 to 1919.

Construction and acquisition 
Beaumere II was built as the private motorboat Madge II in 1914 by the Gas Engine and Power Company and the Charles L. Seabury Company at Morris Heights, the Bronx, New York. She later was renamed Beaumere.

On 29 June 1917, the U.S. Navy acquired Beaumere under a free lease from her owner, the vaudeville impresario Edward Franklin Albee II (1857–1930), for use as a section patrol vessel during World War I. The Navy took delivery of her from Albee on 18 July 1917. The Navy added the Roman numeral II to her name and commissioned her as USS Beaumere II (SP-444) on 22 October 1917.

United States Navy service 
Assigned to the 3rd Naval District, Beaumere II operated principally from the New York Navy Yard, the Barge Office at Battery Park, and the Marine Basin at Ulmer Park in Brooklyn, New York, as a despatch boat for the rest of World War I and into early 1919. She spent her entire naval career carrying passengers between various locations on the shores of the East River and North River, to Staten Island, and as far north as West Point, New York, on the Hudson River. During portions of April, May, June, and September 1917, and again in January 1919, she alternated with the patrol boat  as despatch boat at the Barge Office. She interspersed these active operations and stand-by periods with upkeep at the Marine Basin.

Among the naval officers Beaumere II transported numerous times were Rear Admiral Cameron McRae Winslow, Inspector of Naval Districts on the Atlantic Coast, Rear Admiral Nathan R. Usher, Commandant of the 3rd Naval District, and Ushers chief of staff, Captain Louis R. de Steiguer, who was a frequent passenger. Other distinguished passengers included Vice Admiral DeWitt Coffman and his staff, on a trip from the New York Navy Yard out to the French Navy armored cruiser Dupetit-Thouars on 27 June 1918; Major General J. Franklin Bell, United States Army, who was embarked with a small party for an excursion up the Hudson River to West Point on 1 September 1918; Admiral William S. Benson, the Chief of Naval Operations, whom Beaumere II transported to the transport  on 17 October 1918; and the Brazilian Ambassador to the United States E. H. DeGama and his wife, whom Beaumere II took out to the armored cruiser USS Pueblo (Armored Cruiser No.7) on 22 October 1918 for the start of DeGamas journey back to Rio de Janeiro.

Perhaps Beaumere IIs most eventful trip occurred on 10 July 1918 with Captain DeSteiguer embarked. She was en route the Barge Office at Battery Park when she encountered a heavy swell caused by the passage of an outward-bound battleship. Water entered Beaumere IIs engine room through an open port, short-circuiting the port motor. Although hampered by having to proceed on one engine, Beaumere II continued on her way and delivered DeStiguer to the Barge Office safely.

Disposal 
Beaumere IIs final voyage while in commission was to Pier 72 in New York City on 15 February 1919. After being decommissioned there, Beaumere II was stricken from the Navy Directory on 24 February 1919 and returned to Albee the same day.

Later career 
Reverting to her original name, Beaumere, she remained under Albees ownership through 1929, after which she became the property of the Marine Sales and Service Company, of New York City. Her last owner appears to have been a Joseph White, through 1949, after which time the name Beaumere disappears from contemporary yacht registers.

References 

Department of the Navy Naval History and Heritage Command Online Library of Selected Images: Civilian Ships: Beaumere II (American Motor Boat, 1914). Formerly named Madge II. Served as USS Beaumere II (SP-444) in 1917–1919
NavSource Online: Section Patrol Craft Photo Archive: Beaumere II (SP 444)

Patrol vessels of the United States Navy
World War I patrol vessels of the United States
Ships built in Morris Heights, Bronx
1914 ships